Best of 2Pac is a posthumous greatest hits compilation series from rapper Tupac Shakur released in two parts – Thug and Life. Both albums were released on December 4, 2007 in the United States and December 3, 2007 in the United Kingdom, having had been leaked on November 30. As of September 2011, more than 212,399 copies of Thug have been sold in the United States, while Life has sold more than 135,249.

Best of 2Pac, Part 1: Thug

Best of 2Pac, Part 1: Thug is a posthumously released compilation album which is the first part of Best of 2Pac. It is sold separately from part 2 and was released on December 4, 2007. It consists mostly of songs released before his death.

Track listing

Charts

Weekly charts

Year-end charts

Certifications

Best of 2Pac, Part 2: Life

Best of 2Pac, Part 2: Life is a posthumously released compilation album which is the second part of Best of 2Pac. It is sold separately from part 1 and was released on December 4, 2007. It consists mostly of songs released after his death.

Track listing

Charts

References

External links
  – the official website, operated by Tupac Shakur's estate
 

2007 greatest hits albums
Compilation albums published posthumously
Compilation album series
Tupac Shakur compilation albums
Albums produced by Johnny "J"
Albums produced by Jake One
Gangsta rap compilation albums